Calendar Days is The Rocket Summer's first full-length album, released in 2003. In Japan, this album included a bonus track titled "She's a Seven" which was later released in the US on The Early Years EP. The album title comes from the track "TV Family".

Track listing

Personnel 
The Rocket Summer
 Bryce Avary – vocals, guitar, bass, drums, piano, keyboard, production

Additional personnel
 Duane Deering – mixing
 Darrell LaCour – mixing
 Gavin Lurssen – mastering
 Adrian Hulet – backing vocals on tracks 1 and 5
 The 02-03 Colleyville Middle School 6th Grade Concert Girls' Choir – vocals on track 9

References 

2003 debut albums
The Rocket Summer albums